Laurel was a 48-gun fourth-rate of the navy of the Commonwealth of England. She participated in almost all major Fleet Actions of the First Anglo-Dutch War. She was an active participant in the battles of Kentish Knock, Dungeness, Portland, The Gabbard and Scheveningen. She went to the west Indies with Admiral William Penn. She was wrecked in May 1657.

Laurel was the first named vessel in the English and Royal Navy.

Construction and specifications
She was ordered by Parliament on 5 February 1651 to be built at Portsmouth Dockyard under the guidance of Master Shipwright John Tippetts. Her builder's measure tonnage was 489 tons.

Her gun armament in 1651 was 46 guns. By 1653 her guns were increased to either 48 or 50 guns. Her guns would consist of culverins, on the lower deck with demi-culverines, on the upper deck and sakers. on the quarterdeck. Her manning was 180 personnel and rose to 200 personnel in 1653.

Commissioned service

Service in Commonwealth Navy
She was commissioned in 1651 under the command of Captain John Taylor. She was at the Battle of Kentish Knock on 28 September 1652. Following this engagement she was at the Battle of Dungeness on 29 November 1652. Shortly afterwards Captain Taylor was dismissed and replace by Captain John Wadsworth. In early 1653 she came under the command of Captain Samuel Howett. She was at the Battle of Portland on 18 February 1653 as the Flagship of Rear-Admiral Howett in Red Squadron. After the battle Captain John Stoakes took command. She remained in Red Squadron, Van Division for the Battle of the Gabbard on 2-3 June 1653. On 31 July she participated in the Battle of Scheveningen near Texel. In the fall of 1653 Captain Richard Newberry took command and spent the winter of 1653/54 at Chatham.

With the end of the war she came under Captain William Crispin in 1655 and sailed with Admiral William Penn's Fleet to the West Indies. In the second half of 1655 she came under the command of Captain William Kirby.

Loss
She was wrecked off Greater Yarmouth on 30 May 1657.

Notes

Citations

References

 Lavery, Brian (2003) The Ship of the Line - Volume 1: The development of the battlefleet 1650-1850. Conway Maritime Press. .
 British Warships in the Age of Sail (1603 – 1714), by Rif Winfield, published by Seaforth Publishing, England © Rif Winfield 2009, EPUB :
 Fleet Actions, 1.3 Battle of Kentish Knock 28 September 1652
 Fleet Actions, 1.4 Battle of Dungeness
 Fleet Actions, 1.5 Battle off Portland (the 'Three Days Battle') 18 - 20 February 1653
 Fleet Actions, 1.7 Battle of the Gabbard (North Foreland) 2 - 3 June 1653
 Fleet Actions, 1.8 Battle of Scheveningen (off Texel) 31 July 1653
 Chapter 4 Fourth Rates - 'Small Ships', Vessels acquired from 25 March 1603, 1651 Programme Group, Laurel
 Ships of the Royal Navy, by J.J. Colledge, revised and updated by Lt-Cdr Ben Warlow and Steve Bush, published by Seaforth Publishing, Barnsley, Great Britain, © the estate of J.J. Colledge, Ben Warlow and Steve Bush 2020, EPUB , Section L (Laurel)
 The Arming and Fitting of English Ships of War 1800 - 1815, by Brian Lavery, published by US Naval Institute Press © Brian Lavery 1989, Part V Guns, Type of Guns

Ships of the English navy
1650s ships